Maki Ito (伊藤 槙紀, Ito Maki, born 8 September 1984) is a Japanese para table tennis player. She won one of the bronze medals in the women's C11 event at the 2020 Summer Paralympics held in Tokyo, Japan. 

She also competed in the women's C11 event at the 2016 Summer Paralympics held in Rio de Janeiro, Brazil.

References 

Living people
1984 births
Sportspeople from Yokohama
Japanese female table tennis players
Paralympic table tennis players of Japan
Paralympic bronze medalists for Japan
Paralympic medalists in table tennis
Table tennis players at the 2016 Summer Paralympics
Table tennis players at the 2020 Summer Paralympics
Medalists at the 2020 Summer Paralympics
20th-century Japanese women
21st-century Japanese women